Mario Arnello Romo (born 25 December 1925) is a Chilean lawyer, scholar, poet and politician, and one of the founders of the right-wing National Party in 1966.

During Augusto Pinochet's dictatorship (1973–1990), Arnello was director of DIBAM (1986–1990) and special ambassador both at United Nations (1974–1978) and in the Organization of American States (1974–1976).

Biography

Early life
Born in 1925, his parents were José Arnello Alcorta and Zulema Romo Romo. His maternal side made him involved in politics, world he already knew well through familiars like his uncle Luis Salas Romo, politician from Radical Party, who was minister during the first government of Arturo Alessandri Palma (1920–1924), whom Arnello knew when he was eight.

He completed his secondary studies at Instituto Nacional General José Miguel Carrera, where he performed as Student Center's president. Likewise, in 1941, he was one of the founding members of institution's Castilian Letters Academy (whose Spanish acronym is ALCIN) while he was in the 5th grade. There he met with Chilean important writers such as Pablo Neruda, Salvador Reyes and Francisco Coloane. Around 1938–1941 seasons, he felt attraction for nationalist ideas, so that he had sympathy towards to National Socialist Movement of Chile, the fascist murdered group in the Seguro Obrero massacre (1938) under Alessandri Palma's second government (1932–1938).

In early 1940s, he joined Universidad de Chile School of Laws, receiving him with a thesis called "Syndicalism", which was approved with distinction. A time later after his certification, he reached a scholarship from Instituto de Cultura Hispánica (then controlled by francoism) for a PhD in law at University of Madrid. This time his thesis (made in 1953) was called "El sindicato español" (the Spanish syndicate), which was influenced by National syndicalists political ideas of the Spanish fascist party FET y de las JONS (commonly known as Falange; 1937–1977).

References

External links
 Arnello Romo Profile at Chile's National Congress Library

1925 births
Living people
People from Santiago
Chilean people of Ligurian descent
National Action (Chile, 1963) politicians
National Party (Chile, 1966) politicians
Deputies of the XLVI Legislative Period of the National Congress of Chile
Deputies of the XLVII Legislative Period of the National Congress of Chile
20th-century Chilean lawyers
University of Chile alumni